The Caleb Bragg Estate, in the unincorporated village of Montauk, New York, was built in 1929.  It was designed by Walker & Gillette.  It was listed on the National Register of Historic Places in 1987.

In 1987, the estate included seven contributing buildings, one other contributing structure, and one contributing site.

It is a  estate on Star Island in Lake Montauk.  Walker and Gillette were the architects.

See also
Caleb Bragg

References

Houses on the National Register of Historic Places in New York (state)
Houses completed in 1929
Houses in Suffolk County, New York
National Register of Historic Places in Suffolk County, New York